Magpie is an upcoming noir film directed by Sam Yates, starring Daisy Ridley and Shazad Latif. Ridley developed the story, and the screenplay was written by her husband Tom Bateman.

Premise 
A father chaperones his daughter, who is costarring in a film with a popular actress, while his wife is at home with their newborn baby. He soon finds himself falling in love with the actress.

Cast 
 Daisy Ridley
 Shazad Latif
 Matilda Lutz

Development

Production 
Before the 2022 Cannes Film Market, Magpie was announced as a project for buyers to distribute.  The film had Sam Yates attached to direct a screenplay written by Tom Bateman.  The original story was developed by Daisy Ridley, who was also attached to star opposite Shazad Latif.  Matilda Lutz was included in the cast as well.

Filming 
Principal photography began on January 24, 2023, and it is expected to last for a month.

References

External links 
 

Upcoming films
Film noir
2020s American films
English-language films
Upcoming English-language films